Indian Shores is a town in Pinellas County, Florida, United States. The town is a beach-front community situated on a barrier island west of Seminole. The population was 1,420 at the 2010 census.

Geography

Indian Shores is located at  (27.850668, –82.843407).  Indian Shores is bordered by the beach communities of Indian Rocks Beach to the north and Redington Shores to the south.

Demographics

As of the census of 2000, there were 1,705 people, 989 households, and 483 families residing in the town. The racial makeup of the town was 98.36% White, 0.23% African American, 0.06% Native American, 0.41% Asian, 0.06% Pacific Islander, 0.12% from other races, and 0.76% from two or more races. Hispanic or Latino of any race were 3.46% of the population.

There were 989 households, out of which 5.8% had children under the age of 18 living with them, 41.1% were married couples living together, 5.2% had a female householder with no husband present, and 51.1% were non-families. 42.8% of all households were made up of individuals, and 17.7% had someone living alone who was 65 years of age or older.  The average household size was 1.72 and the average family size was 2.26.

In the town, the population was spread out, with 6.1% under the age of 18, 2.6% from 18 to 24, 19.2% from 25 to 44, 40.0% from 45 to 64, and 32.1% who were 65 years of age or older.  The median age was 56 years. For every 100 females, there were 96.4 males.  For every 100 females age 18 and over, there were 93.6 males.

The median income for a household in the town was $45,000, and the median income for a family was $61,641. Males had a median income of $45,375 versus $35,875 for females. The per capita income for the town was $40,002.  About 5.4% of families and 6.9% of the population were below the poverty line, including 9.3% of those under age 18 and 9.8% of those age 65 or over.

Facilities and services

The town has undergone multiple construction and renovation projects, including utility under-grounding, road re-surfacing, and the placement of pedestrian safety measures. The town staff recently moved into a new municipal center which replaces the decades-old, antiquated facility.  The new building houses all Town Departments, and a Council Chambers for official meetings. The fourth floor of the building has a large banquet hall, with waterfront balcony views on both sides.

Indian Shores also maintains a municipal police department, staffed and operational 24 hours per day, 365 days a year. The ISPD occupies a new modernized operations facility in the Municipal Center. The Police Department also provides services to the neighboring town of Redington Shores. Services are provided through traditional vehicle patrol, as well as ATV patrol on the sand beach areas. In addition to uniformed services, the department has a Criminal Investigation Division. Created in 1964, the Police Department is currently headed by Chief Richard (Rick) Swann.

See also

 Tiki Gardens

References

External links

Town of Indian Shores official website

Towns in Pinellas County, Florida
Towns in Florida
Populated coastal places in Florida on the Gulf of Mexico
Beaches of Pinellas County, Florida
Beaches of Florida